Mau5trap (stylized as mau5trap; pronounced "mousetrap") is a Canadian independent record label founded in 2007 by electronic music producer Deadmau5. The label was formerly a vanity label, hosting releases through labels such as Ultra Music, Virgin Records, and Astralwerks.

History

In 2007, Mau5trap was founded by Canadian electronic music producer Deadmau5 (Joel Zimmerman). The label's first release was Zimmerman's "Faxing Berlin", also released by Play Records and Cinnamon Flava. The second artist on the label was Canadian DJ Glenn Morrison, which Zimmerman later revealed to have ghost produced for. In 2008, after more artists were signed to moderate success, Mau5trap partnered with Ultra Records and released Zimmerman's third studio album, Random Album Title to commercial success.

In 2010, Mau5trap signed American producer Skrillex, and released his second EP Scary Monsters and Nice Sprites in partnership with Big Beat Records.

In 2012, Mau5trap signed English hip hop group Foreign Beggars and released their third studio album The Uprising, Moguai released his second studio album Mpire, Noisia released a special edition of Split the Atom, and Mau5trap debuted the compilation series We Are Friends.

In 2013, following Zimmerman's departure from Ultra Records, Mau5trap ended their partnership with the former partner label. In June 2013, Mau5trap briefly partnered with Astralwerks, a subsidiary of Universal Music Group. In 2015, Mau5trap became a fully independent record label with music rights and publishing managed through Kobalt Music Group.

In 2016, Zimmerman's eighth studio album, W:/2016ALBUM/, became Mau5trap's first fully independent album release. In 2017, Mau5trap also independently released the debut studio album by Canadian music producer Rezz, titled Mass Manipulation.

In 2017, Mau5trap celebrated its tenth anniversary, and released a thirty-three–track compilation album titled Mau5trap Ten Year Anniversary.

Artists

Releases

References

External links 
 

Canadian independent record labels
Deadmau5
Electronic music record labels
Record labels established in 2007
Electronic dance music record labels